Marius Roustan, also known as Mario Roustan, (1870–1942) was a French politician. He served as a member of the French Senate from 1920 to 1941, representing Hérault.

References

1870 births
1942 deaths
People from Sète
Politicians from Occitania (administrative region)
Independent Radical politicians
French Ministers of National Education
French Senators of the Third Republic
Senators of Hérault